Davellyn LaRae Whyte (born May 14, 1991) is a professional basketball player who last played for the San Antonio Stars of the WNBA.

College
Whyte played basketball for the Arizona Wildcats women's basketball team. When she left the team she set numerous accomplishments. She was the team's number 2 career leader in points scored (2,059), number 1 in career starts (126), number 1 in minutes played (4,243), compiled the first triple-double, and scored a double-double in 100 out of 126 career games. She was also the highest WNBA Draft pick in Wildcats history.

Arizona  statistics
Source

WNBA
Whyte was the 16th pick in the 2013 WNBA Draft.

Personal
Whyte is the daughter of former MLB All-Star Devon Whyte.

References

External links
Arizona Wildcats bio

Living people
1991 births
American women's basketball players
Arizona Wildcats women's basketball players
Basketball players from Arizona
San Antonio Silver Stars draft picks
San Antonio Stars players
Sportspeople from Mesa, Arizona
Guards (basketball)